Nicolas Kischkewitz (born 4 April 1974) is a French former professional tennis player.

Kischkewitz, a right-handed player from Marseille, was a 1992 French Open junior semi-finalist.

While competing on the professional circuit he reached a best singles ranking of 260. His best ATP Tour performance came as a main draw qualifier at the 1993 Dutch Open, where he had a first round win over world number 61 Horacio de la Peña, then fell to third seed Thomas Muster.

References

External links
 
 

1974 births
Living people
French male tennis players
Tennis players from Marseille